Byaban District, Minab County, Hormozgan Province, Iran. At the 2006 census, its population was 72, in 11 families.

References

Populated places in Minab County